Southern University Law Center is a public law school in Baton Rouge, Louisiana.  It is part of the historically black Southern University System and was opened for instruction in September 1947. It was authorized by the Louisiana State Board of Education as a Law School for blacks to be located at Southern University, a historically black college, and to open for the 1947-1948 academic session.

The school offers full-time, part-time, and evening programs. For students who want to pursue the JD and MPA, the school offers a joint-degree program in cooperation with the Nelson Mandela School of Public Policy and Urban Affairs at Southern. SULC's students learn two different systems of law: Louisiana is a civil law jurisdiction (in the tradition of France and Continental Europe), while law in every other state is based on the British common-law tradition.

A study-abroad program is offered in London, in which students take courses with international subject matter. SULC publishes two legal journals: its traditional Southern University Law Review and The Journal of Race, Gender and Poverty.

According to SULC's 2019 ABA-required disclosures, 43.9% of the Class of 2019 obtained full-time, long-term, bar passage-required employment ten months after graduation, excluding solo practitioners.

History
In 1946, Charles J. Hatfield, III, an African-American veteran of Louisiana, applied to Louisiana State University Law School, the only state school that offered a law degree. Although he was academically qualified, he was rejected because of his race, as the state system was segregated. Hatfield filed suit against the state for rejecting his application. While he did not win in court, the State Board of Education decided to found a law school for African Americans.

The State Board of Education responded by deciding at its January 10, 1947, meeting to found a law school at Southern University to serve African-American students, to open in September of that year. On June 14, 1947, the Board of Liquidation of State Debt appropriated $40,000 for the operation of the school. The Southern University Law School was officially opened in September 1947 to provide legal education for African-American students in the state. The first dean of the law school was Aguinaldo Alfonso Lenoir, Sr. After 38 years of operation as a School of Law, the Southern University Board of Supervisors re-designated the school as the Southern University Law Center. The building that houses the law center is named A.A. Lenoir Hall after its first dean. 

From 1972 to 1974, the law school dean was Louis Berry, a civil rights attorney originally from Alexandria, Louisiana.

Today, the law school is one of only two public law schools in the state. Its student body is the most diverse in the state of Louisiana.

Accreditation
The Law Center program is accredited by the American Bar Association, the Supreme Court of Louisiana, the Commission on Colleges of the Southern Association of Colleges and Schools, and the Association of American Law Schools. It is approved also by the Veterans Administration for the training of eligible veterans.

Admissions
The Southern University Law Center 2018 first year class had an admission rate of 60.71% with 46.09% of admitted students enrolling, enrolled students having an average LSAT score of 145 and average GPA of 2.99.

Clinical program
At Southern University Law Center, clinical education is available to second and third-year students but not required.
 Administrative/Civil Law Clinic
 Criminal Law Clinic
 Domestic Violence Clinic
 Elder Law Clinic
 Juvenile Law Clinic
 Low-income Taxpayer Clinic
 Mediation Clinic

Physical plant

Housed in the  A. A. Lenoir Hall, the Law Center's program of study is designed to ensure that students graduate with a comprehensive knowledge of civil law and common law. Though emphasis is given to the substantive and procedural law of Louisiana, with its French and Spanish origins, Anglo-American law is integrated into the curriculum.

Employment 
According to SULC's official 2019 ABA-required disclosures, 43.87% of the Class of 2019 obtained full-time, long-term, bar passage-required employment ten months after graduation, excluding solo-practitioners. SULC's Law School Transparency under-employment score is 19.4%, indicating the percentage of the Class of 2018 unemployed, pursuing an additional degree, or working in a non-professional, short-term, or part-time job nine months after graduation.

Costs
The total cost of full-time attendance (indicating the cost of tuition, fees, and living expenses) at SULC for the 2019-2020 academic year is $19,010 for Louisiana Residents and $31,610 for non-residents. The Law School Transparency estimated debt-financed cost of attendance for three years is $156,305 for residents and $205,106 for non-residents.

Recognition 
Ranking among the "Best Law Schools for Public Service" in 2012 by PreLaw Magazine.
Ranking #148-194 in 2020 Best Law Schools by U.S. News & World Report.

Notable alumni

Mike Foster (2004) -- former Governor of Louisiana
Rick Gallot — Tenth president of Grambling State University and Democrat member of both houses of the Louisiana State Legislature: House (2000-2012), Senate (2012-2016)
Kip Holden (1985) -- Mayor of Baton Rouge (2005–2016)
Jeff Cox, judge of the 26th Judicial District in Bossier and Webster parishes since 2005
Michael Owens Craig, judge of the 26th Judicial District Court since 2009
Stephen Dwight (c. 2003) - Republican member of the Louisiana House of Representatives for District 35 in Calcasieu and Beauregard parishes since 2016
Cleo Fields (1987) - politician, former United States Congressman for Louisiana's 4th Congressional District 1993-1997, former gubernatorial candidate
Stephanie A. Finley (1991), United States Attorney
Randal Gaines — member of the Louisiana House since 2012 for St. Charles and St. John the Baptist parishes 
John Michael Guidry, circuit court judge since 1997 and former member of both houses of the Louisiana legislature from Baton Rouge
Marcus Hunter (2005) -- current judge-elect of the Louisiana 4th Judicial District Court. Former member of the Louisiana House of Representatives for District 17 in Ouachita Parish
Edward C. James — member of the Louisiana House of Representatives for District 101 in East Baton Rouge Parish since 2012
Faith Jenkins -- Miss Louisiana 2000, Miss America 2001 first runner-up, attorney, legal analyst, and TV personality.
Edmond Jordan—member of the Louisiana House of Representatives for District 29 in West and East Baton Rouge parishes since 2016
Jay Luneau (1992) -- member of the Louisiana State Senate from Alexandria since 2016
Sherman Q. Mack (1999) -- District 95 state representative
Robert M. Marionneaux (1995) -- Louisiana State Representative from District 18 from 1996–2000, Louisiana State Senator from District 17 from 2000 to 2012.
Jonathan W. Perry (1998) -- State representative from Vermilion and Cameron parishes.
Rick Ward, III - Louisiana state senator from District 17; native and resident of Iberville Parish
Meshea Poore—member of the West Virginia House of Delegates
Terry Reeves - district attorney for Winn Parish (1991-2005)
Jesse N. Stone, Jr. (1950) -- Louisiana Supreme Court Associate Justice pro tempore, Chancellor of SULC 1971-72, President of SU System 1975-85, civil rights attorney, and political leader.
Ledricka Thierry (2003) -- politician, member of the Louisiana House of Representatives for St. Landry Parish since 2009
Alfred C. Williams (1977) -- Member of the Louisiana House of Representatives for East Baton Rouge Parish since 2012; Baton Rouge attorney and former school board member
Ebony Woodruff—state representative for Jefferson Parish since 2013

References

External links
 Official website

Educational institutions established in 1947
Law schools in Louisiana
Universities and colleges accredited by the Southern Association of Colleges and Schools
Law Center
Universities and colleges in Baton Rouge, Louisiana
1947 establishments in Louisiana
Historically black law schools